Cottam Airport  is an airport that is  located  east of Cottam, Ontario, Canada, near Albuna, Ontario.

References

External links
Page about this airport on COPA's Places to Fly airport directory

Registered aerodromes in Essex County, Ontario